Edward Boyd may refer to:

Edward Boyd (surveyor) (1794–1871), Surveyor General of Tasmania and British soldier
Eddie Boyd (1914–1994), American blues piano player
Eddie Boyd (baseball) (1893–1962), American Negro league baseball player
Edward F. Boyd (1914–2007), American marketing executive at Pepsi
Edwin Alonzo Boyd (1914–2002), Canadian criminal, bank robber
Edward Boyd (writer) (1916–1989), Scottish writer
Edward Fenwick Boyd (1810–1889), English industrialist